Marcelo Alexander Pacheco Reyes (born 18 March 1958) is a Chilean footballer and manager. He played in ten matches for the Chile national football team in 1983. He was also part of Chile's squad for the 1983 Copa América tournament.

Playing career
His last club was Everton in 1988.

At international level, he took part of Chile at under-20 level in the 1979 South American Championship. At senior level, he made 10 appearances for Chile in 1983.

Coaching career
Following his retirement, he worked as coach at the youth ranks of Colo-Colo, Santiago Morning and Unión San Felipe. As head coach, he led the Indonesian teams Persma Manado and PSPS Pekanbaru from 2005 to 2007 and the Ecuadorian club Grecia in 2008.

Personal life
Pacheco is the son-in-law of the former football manager Luis Ibarra.

References

External links
 

1958 births
Living people
Footballers from Santiago
Chilean footballers
Chile under-20 international footballers
Chile international footballers
1983 Copa América players
Curicó Unido footballers
Colo-Colo footballers
Naval de Talcahuano footballers
Universidad de Chile footballers
Everton de Viña del Mar footballers
Primera B de Chile players
Chilean Primera División players
Association football defenders
Chilean football managers
Chilean expatriate football managers
Chilean expatriate sportspeople in Indonesia
Chilean expatriate sportspeople in Ecuador
Expatriate football managers in Indonesia
Expatriate football managers in Ecuador